Safronovskaya may refer to:

Safronovskaya, Arkhangelsk Oblast, Russia
Safronovskaya, Vologda Oblast, Russia